Dani Rodrik (born August 14, 1957) is a Turkish economist and Ford Foundation Professor of International Political Economy at the John F. Kennedy School of Government at Harvard University. He was formerly the Albert O. Hirschman Professor of the Social Sciences at the Institute for Advanced Study in Princeton, New Jersey. He has published widely in the areas of international economics, economic development, and political economy. The question of what constitutes good economic policy and why some governments are more successful than others at adopting it is at the center of his research. His works include Economics Rules: The Rights and Wrongs of the Dismal Science and The Globalization Paradox: Democracy and the Future of the World Economy. He is also joint editor-in-chief of the academic journal Global Policy.

Biography
Rodrik is descended from a family of Sephardic Jews.

After graduating from Robert College in Istanbul, he obtained an A.B. degree (summa cum laude) in Government and Economics from Harvard College in 1979. He then earned an M.P.A. degree (with distinction) from Princeton School of Public and International Affairs in 1981 and a Ph.D. degree in Economics from Princeton University in 1985, with the thesis titled Studies on the Welfare Theory of Trade and Exchange-rate Policy.

He had also been writing for the now defunct Turkish daily Radikal 2009–2016.

He joined the newly created World Economics Association as a member of the executive committee in 2011.

He is married to Pınar Doğan, a lecturer in Public Policy at the Harvard Kennedy School. She is the daughter of Turkish retired General Çetin Doğan who was acquitted of an aggravated life imprisonment for his alleged involvement in the alleged Sledgehammer coup plan.

As a scholar, he is affiliated with the National Bureau of Economic Research, Centre for Economic Policy Research (London), Center for Global Development, Institute for International Economics, and the Council on Foreign Relations, and is co-editor of the Review of Economics and Statistics. He has been the recipient of research grants from the Carnegie Corporation, Ford Foundation, and Rockefeller Foundation. Among other honors, he was presented the Leontief Prize for Advancing the Frontiers of Economic Thought in 2002 from the Global Development and Environment Institute.

On 8 November 2019, he received an honorary doctorate from Erasmus University Rotterdam.

On 21 January 2020, Pope Francis named him a member of the Pontifical Academy of Social Sciences.

Work

His 1997 book Has Globalization Gone Too Far? was called “one of the most important economics books of the decade” in Bloomberg Businessweek.

In his article, he focused on three tensions between the global market and social stability. Pointing out that the so-called "globalization" has a dilemma of promoting international equality while exposing fault lines between the nation states with the skills and capitals to succeed in global markets and those without that advantage, he sees the free market system as a threat to social stability and deeply domestic norms. According to his analysis, there are three categories of reasons on why these tensions arise.

First, the tension is caused via globalization because reduced barriers to trade and foreign direct investments draw a vivid line between nations and groups that can take advantage of such cross-border relations and those who cannot. Rodrik refers to the first category of groups as highly skilled workers, professionals and those who are free to take their resources where they are most in demand. The second category would include unskilled workers and semiskilled workers, who, under globalization, as a resource become more elastic and easily substitutive.

The second source for tension comes because globalization engenders conflicts within and between nations over domestic norms and social institutions. Technology and culture are being more standardized around the world, and different nations with different norms and values tend to show repulsion toward such collective norms diffused internationally in a standardized form.

Lastly, the third threat of globalization arises because it has made it extremely difficult for national governments to provide social insurance.

Dani Rodrik is a regular contributor to Project Syndicate since 1998. He also founded Economics for Inclusive Prosperity (EfIP) with Suresh Naidu, Gabriel Zucman, and 11 additional founding members in February 2019.

Selected publications

References

External links

 Dani Rodrik's home page 
 Dani Rodrik's latest research
 Dani Rodrik's weblog
 "Roads to Prosperity" Dani Rodrik's op-ed column for Project Syndicate
 

1957 births
Living people
Anti-globalization writers
École Normale Supérieure alumni
Harvard College alumni
Princeton University alumni
Institute for Advanced Study faculty
Robert College alumni
Harvard Kennedy School faculty
Trade economists
Academics from Istanbul
Turkish expatriates in the United States
Turkish Jews
20th-century  Turkish  economists
21st-century  Turkish  economists
Social Science Research Council
Peterson Institute for International Economics
American academics of Turkish descent
Academics of the London School of Economics